#

Farmsen-Berne is a quarter of Hamburg, Germany, in the borough of Wandsbek. More than 34,000 inhabitants live in an area of 8.3 km2. Farmsen and Berne are part of the area of Walddörfer (lit. forest villages).

Geography
Farmsen-Berne borders the quarters of Rahlstedt, Tonndorf, Wandsbek, Bramfeld, Sasel, and Volksdorf. The stream of Berner Au flows through Farmsen-Berne and, behind the pond of Kupfermühlenteich, into Wandse river.

History
In 1296, the former villages of Farmsen and Berne were first mentioned. Farmsen was then called Vermerschen, deriving of Fridumareshusen or Fridumaresheim, founded by a Franconian settler named Fridumar. The name Berne has its origin in Baren, meaning a small stream - Berner Au in this case. Farmsen-Berne was an exclave of Hamburg in Prussian territory. In 1937, the villages were incorporated into Hamburg by the Greater Hamburg Act, which came into force in 1938.

Politics
These are the results of Farmsen-Berne in the Hamburg state election:

Transportation
Hamburg U-Bahn line U1, the former Walddörfer railway, was built since 1912 in the area and has three stops in Farmsen-Berne: Trabrennbahn, Farmsen, Oldenfelde and Berne, of which Farmsen station is the largest. It has four tracks, and a railway repair workshop is located here.

References

External links

 Farmsen-Berne, Hamburg.de

Quarters of Hamburg
Wandsbek